Puss in Boots is a character in a 1550 Italian fairy tale by Giovanni Francesco Straparola.

Puss in Boots or Puss 'n' Boots may also refer to:

Film and television 
 Puss in Boots (1922 film), an American animated short by Walt Disney
 Puss in Boots (1934 film), a ComiColor Cartoon by Ub Iwerks
 Puss in Boots, a 1936 animated short by Lotte Reiniger
 Puss in Boots, a 1954 animated short by Lotte Reiniger
 Der gestiefelte Kater, a 1955 German feature film directed by Herbert B. Fredersdorf  
 Puss in Boots (1961 film), a Mexican film by Roberto Rodríguez
 Puss in Boots (1969 film), a Japanese animated feature film by Kimio Yabuki
 "Puss in Boots" (Faerie Tale Theatre), a 1985 episode of Faerie Tale Theatre
 Puss in Boots (1988 film), a musical by Eugene Marner starring Christopher Walken
 Adventures of Puss-in-Boots, a 1992 Japanese animated feature film from Enoki Films by Susumu Ishizaki
 Puss in Boots (1993 film), an animated feature film by Richard Slapczynski
 Puss in Boots (1999 film), an American animated feature film by Phil Nibbelink
 The True History of Puss 'N Boots, a 2009 French animated feature film
Puss in Boots (Shrek), a main character in the Shrek franchise
 Puss in Boots (2011 film), an American animated film featuring the version from Shrek
 The Adventures of Puss in Boots, a 2015 Netflix animated television series featuring the version from Shrek
 Puss in Boots: The Last Wish, a 2022 computer-animated film starring Puss in Boots from the Shrek franchise

Music 
Puss n Boots, an American alternative country group
Puss in Boots (opera), a 1913 short opera by César Cui
"Puss 'n' Boots", a 1974 song by New York Dolls from Too Much Too Soon
"Puss 'n Boots", a 1983 song by Adam Ant from Strip
"Puss N' Boots" (song), a 1989 song by Kon Kan
Puss 'n Boots (The Struggle Continues...), a 1993 album by Professor X the Overseer
Puss 'n' Boots (album), a 2003 album by Crash Test Dummies

Literature 
Puss 'n' Boots (comics), a character pair in the Sparky comic book series
Puss in Boots (Pinkney book), a 2012 picture book by Jerry Pinkney
Puss in Boots, a 1952 picture book illustrated by Marcia Brown
Puss in Boots, a 1990 picture book illustrated by Fred Marcellino
Puss in Boots, an 1842 work by Frances Sargent Osgood

Video games 
Puss 'n Boots: Pero's Great Adventure, a 1990 video game for the Nintendo Entertainment System
Puss in Boots (video game), a 2011 video game by Blitz Games

See also
List of Puss in Boots adaptations
The Tale of Kitty-in-Boots